Route 117 is a  state route in the U.S. state of Rhode Island. Its western terminus is at Route 14 in Coventry, and its eastern terminus is at U.S. Route 1A (US 1A) in Cranston.

Route description
Coventry: 14.0 miles (22.5 km); Route 14 to West Warwick town line
Flat River Road, Main Street and Washington Street
West Warwick: 1.8 miles (2.9 km); Coventry town line to Warwick city line
West Warwick Avenue, Main Street and Legris Avenue
Warwick: 8.4 miles (13.5 km); West Warwick town line to Cranston city line
Legris Avenue, Centerville Road, [Post Road] (Greenwich Avenue, Veterans Memorial Drive, Post Road), West Shore Road, Shore Road and Warwick Avenue
Cranston: 0.6 miles (1.0 km); Warwick city line to US 1A (Intersection of Warwick Avenue, Norwood Avenue and Broad Street)
Warwick Avenue

History
Route 117 was one of the original Rhode Island State highways, instated in 1922.  Its alignment has changed little since that time.

In the late 1990s, Route 117's eastern terminus was cut back.  Originally, Route 117 stayed with Broad Street through Cranston and into Providence, ending at U.S. 1.  The reason the eastern terminus was trimmed back is unclear.

Major intersections

Notes
Route 117 ends abruptly while concurrent with US 1A at the intersection of Broad Street, Warwick Avenue and Norwood Avenue.  At this intersection, US 1A makes a turn off Broad Street onto Norwood Avenue while Route 117 ends.

Route 117A

Route 117A is a numbered State Highway running  in Rhode Island.

Route description
Route 117A takes the following route through the State:
Warwick: ; Route 117 to Route 117
Oakland Beach Avenue
Warwick Avenue

Route 117A is a shorter route than the part of Route 117 that it bypasses.

Major intersections

References

External links

2019 Highway Map, Rhode Island

117
Transportation in Kent County, Rhode Island
Transportation in Providence County, Rhode Island
Coventry, Rhode Island
West Warwick, Rhode Island
Warwick, Rhode Island
Cranston, Rhode Island